The Right Combination is a 1980 duet album by Linda Clifford and Curtis Mayfield.

History
Originally released on Curtom, it was recorded in Chicago except "It's Lovin' Time (Your Baby's Home)" recorded in Philadelphia. The album was produced by Curtis Mayfield and Gil Askey except “Ain't No Love Lost” solely by Mayfield and “It's Lovin' Time (Your Baby's Home)” by Curtis Mayfield, Norman Harris and Bruce Gray. Gil Askey arranged the album except “It's Lovin' Time (Your Baby's Home)” which was arranged by Norman Harris. Linda Clifford has collaborated with Gil Askey and Curtis Mayfield on her previous four albums for Curtom and with Norman Harris on an album released just before (Here's My Love). In 1980 she would sing "Red light" for the Fame soundtrack and collaborate with Isaac Hayes for her next album. The album was reissued on CD in 1999 in Britain with 11 bonus tracks (8 by Clifford, 3 by Mayfield) and a bonus 1972 radio interview of Mayfield on an additional CD.

Track listing

Personnel
Lucky Scott, Keni Burke – bass 
Sonny Seals – saxophone
Bruce Gaitsch, Ross Traut, Tom Ferrone, Curtis Mayfield – guitars
Lonnie Reaves, Tim Tobias – keyboards
Wendell Stewart – drums
Alejo, Tony Carpenter, Henry Gibson – percussion, toys
Curtom String and Horn Players – horns, strings
Sol Bobrov – strings contractor
Lenard Druss, Arthur Hoyle – horns contractor
Henry Hicks, Jr., Alphonzo Surrett, Ricky Linton – background vocals on "Ain't No Love Lost", "Rock You to Your Socks", and "The Right Combination"

References

External links
 

1980 albums
Linda Clifford albums
Curtis Mayfield albums
Albums produced by Curtis Mayfield
Albums produced by Gil Askey
Albums produced by Norman Harris
RSO Records albums
Curtom Records albums
Collaborative albums